The St. Clair Limestone is a geologic formation in Arkansas, Indiana, Missouri, and Oklahoma. It preserves fossils dating back to the Silurian period. This high density, high magnesium dolomitic limestone was originally classified as a marble in Oklahoma due to the fact that it would hold a high polish, hence Marble City.

Physical characteristics

Paleofauna

Brachiopods

 Ancillotoechia
 A. marginata
 Antirhynchonella
 A. thomasi 
 Atrypa 
 Atrypina 
 A. erugata 
 Boucotides
 B. barrandei 
 Brachymimulus
 B. americanus 
 B. elongatus 
 Cymostrophia 
 Dicamaropsis
 D. parva 
 Dicoelosia
 D. bilobella 

 Dolrorthis
 D. nanella 
 Eospirifer
 E. acutolineatus acutolineatus 
 E. acutolineatus pentagonus 
 Hircinisca
 H. havliceki 
 Homoeospirella
 H. costatula arkansana 
 H. pygmaea 
 Howellella
 H. splendens 
 Kozlowskiellina
 K. vaningeni 
 Leangella
 L. (Opikella) dissiticostella 
 Leptaena 

 Lissostrophia 
 Meristina
 M. clairensis 
 Nanospira
 N. clairensis 
 Nucleospira
 N. raritas 
 Onychotreta
 O. angustata 
 O. lenta 
 O. (Eilotreta) miseri 
 O. multiplicata 
 O. (Lissotreta) plicata 
 Orthostrophella
 O. clairensis 
 Oxoplecia
 O. infrequens 

 Parastrophinella
 P. lepida 
 Placotriplesia
 P. juvenis 
 P. praecipta 
 Plectatrypa
 P. arctoimbricata 
 Plectodonta 
 Plicocyrtia
 P. arkansana 
 Resserella 
 Shaleria 
 Streptis
 S. glomerata 
 Virginiata
 V. arkansana

Conodonts

 Acodus
 A. inornatus
 A. unicostatus
 Ambalodus
 A. triangularis
 Belodella
 B. flexa
 Belodina
 B. inclinata
 Carniodus
 C. carnulus
 C. carnus
 Cordylodus
 C. delicatus
 C. flexuosus

 Distacodus
 D. mehli
 D. posterocostatus
 D. procerus
 Distomodus
 D. kentuckyensis
 Drepanodus
 D. homocurvatus
 Hadrognathus
 H. staurognathoides
 Hindeodella
 H. equidentata
 Ligonodina
 L. egregia
 L. silurica

 Neoprioniodus
 N. costatus
 N. excavatus
 N. multiformis
 N. subcarnus
 Oistodus
 O. inclinatus
 Ozarkodina
 O. gaertneri
 O. inclinata
 O. media
 O. ziegleri
 Paltodus
 P. multicostatus
 P. trigonius

 Panderodus
 P. gracilis
 P. simplex
 P. unicostatus
 Plectospathodus
 P. extensus
 Pterospathodus
 P. amorphognathoides
 Spathognathodus
 S. ranuliformis
 S. rhenanus
 S. wolfordi
 Trichonodella
 T. brassfieldensis
 T. carinata
 T. exacta
 T. variflexa

Trilobites

 Ananaspis
 Balizoma 
 Cheirurus
 C. phollikodes 
 C. prolixus 
 Cornuporoetus
 C. kyphora 
 Dalmanites
 D. howelli 
 D. ptyktorhion 

 Decoroproetus
 D. anaglyptus 
 D. corycoeus 
 Deiphon
 D. longifrons 
 Delops 
 Diacalymene
 D. altirostris 
 Encrinurus
 E. egani 

 Eophacops
 E. fontana 
 Harpidella
 H. butorus 
 H. spinulocervix 
 Lepidoproetus
 L. (Dipharangus) xeo 
 Proetidae 
 Proetus
 P. vaningeni 

 Radnoria 
 Raphiophorus
 R. niagarensis 
 Sphaerexochus
 S. glaber 
 Staurocephalus
 S. lagena 
 S. oarion 
 Sthenarocalymene
 S. scutula 
 Tropidocoryphinae

See also

 List of fossiliferous stratigraphic units in Arkansas
 Paleontology in Arkansas

References

 

Silurian Arkansas
Silurian southern paleotemperate deposits